Sapthagiri College of Engineering(SCE) is an Engineering college in  Bangalore, India started in the year 2001.

About
Sapthagiri College of Engineering (SCE) is located at Chikkasandra, Hesarghatta Main Road, Bangalore. SCE is affiliated to Visvesvaraya Technological University, Belgaum and approved by the All India Council for Technical Education.

Sapthagiri College of Engineering maintains and creates an enabling learning environment for the students. It offers courses such as civil engineering, mechanical engineering, information science & engineering, biotechnology, electrical & electronics engineering, computer science & engineering, and electronics & communications engineering.

Courses offered

Undergraduate
Biotechnology
Civil Engineering
Computer Science & Engineering
Information Science & Engineering
Electronics & Communications Engineering
Electrical and Electronics Engineering and
Mechanical  Engineering

Postgraduate
Computer Science & Engineering
VLSI design & Embedded system.

Research centers
Biotechnology
Chemistry
Physics
Computer Science & Engineering
Electronics & Communications Engineering
Mechanical  Engineering

References

External links

Official Website of Visvesvaraya Technological University

Engineering colleges in Bangalore
Educational institutions established in 2001
2001 establishments in Karnataka